2008 Rugby League World Cup qualifying matches took place from April 2006 to November 2007. Of the ten teams to compete in the 2008 Rugby League World Cup, five of them qualified based on their performance in these matches. The other five teams had qualified automatically.

Qualified teams
6 Asian-Pacific teams qualified for the World Cup; 3 qualified automatically, with the top 2 in the Pacific qualifying group also reaching the finals. Samoa finished third in the Pacific qualifying group and earned a qualification spot by winning the repechage. 4 European teams qualified for the World Cup. 2 qualified automatically, with a further 2 finals berths for the winner of each European qualifying group. No teams from the Atlantic qualifying group reached the finals, with the USA losing at the repechage semi-final stage.

Europe

First round

Second round
Group A

Group B
In early 2011, Ireland and Lebanon's two draws, which involved Ryan Tandy and Jai Ayoub, became subject to police investigation as the two had been connected to match-fixing.

Pacific

Atlantic
Originally, the USA, Japan, South Africa and West Indies were going to compete in a four-team tournament at Bernie Robbins Stadium, Atlantic City, from 21–28 October. 

However, the West Indies and South Africa withdrew before the draw, and a one-off match was played between Japan and the USA.

Repechage

Semi-finals

Final

Therefore, Samoa qualified for the final position at the World Cup to be held in Australia in 2008.

See also
 Rugby League World Cup
 2008 Rugby League World Cup

References

Sources
 "World Cup European Preliminary Qualifying Tournament – Euro B", Rugby League European Federation website, retrieved 8 May 2006
 "Rugby League World Cup 2008 – European Qualifying Group", Rugby League European Federation website, retrieved 15 May 2006
 "Impressive Georgia Outrun Dutch in 2nd Half", Rugby League European Federation website, retrieved 28 May 2006
 "World Cup 2008 – European Qualifying Ground", Rugby League European Federation website, retrieved 20 June 2006
 "The Road to World Cup 2008", Scotland Rugby League website, retrieved 16 July 2006.

2006 in rugby league
2007 in rugby league
Qualifying
2006 in Welsh rugby league
2007 in Welsh rugby league
2006 in Dutch sport
2006 in Russian sport
2006 in Georgian sport
2006 in Serbian sport
2006 in Scottish sport
2007 in Scottish sport
2006 in Irish sport
2007 in Irish sport
2006 in Lebanese sport
2007 in Lebanese sport
2007 in Russian sport
2006 in Tongan sport
2006 in Fijian sport
2006 in Samoan sport
2006 in Cook Islands sport
2006 in American sports
2006 in Japanese sport
2007 in American sports
2007 in Samoan sport